Toni Livers (born 2 June 1983 in Trun) is a Swiss former cross-country skier. Livers began competing in 2000 and competed in the World Cup from 2003 to 2020. His best individual finish at the FIS Nordic World Ski Championships was ninth in the 15 km + 15 km double pursuit at Sapporo in 2007.

Livers' best finish at the Winter Olympics was tenth in the 4 x 10 km relay at Vancouver in 2010.

His only World Cup victory occurred in the 15 km event in Davos, Switzerland, on 3 February 2007. He finished third at the 9 km Final Climb event at the 2014–15 Tour de Ski. Livers also has seven individual victories in lesser events from 2002 to 2005. He retired after the 2019–20 season.

Cross-country skiing results
All results are sourced from the International Ski Federation (FIS).

Olympic Games

World Championships

World Cup

Season standings

Individual podiums
1 victory – (1 ) 
2 podiums – (1 , 1 )

Team podiums
 1 victory – (1 ) 
 1 podium – (1 )

References

External links
 
 
 

1983 births
Cross-country skiers at the 2006 Winter Olympics
Cross-country skiers at the 2010 Winter Olympics
Cross-country skiers at the 2014 Winter Olympics
Cross-country skiers at the 2018 Winter Olympics
Living people
Olympic cross-country skiers of Switzerland
Swiss male cross-country skiers
Tour de Ski skiers
Sportspeople from Graubünden